Tilleda is an unincorporated census-designated place in the town of Seneca in Shawano County, Wisconsin, United States. The community is located on County Highway A less than one mile (one kilometer) north of Wisconsin Highway 29. The community uses the 54978 ZIP code. As of the 2010 census, its population is 91.

Tilleda pond on the Embarrass River is used for ice racing in January and February by the Tilleda Thunder program. 
Tilleda may have been founded by German immigrants from the village of Tilleda (Kyffhaeuser) in central Germany.

Wolverine Fire Apparatus (blue buildings shown in pictures) is the largest employer in Tilleda.

Images

Climate
The Köppen Climate Classification subtype for this climate is "Dfb" (Warm Summer Continental Climate).
<div style="width:75%;">

References

Census-designated places in Wisconsin
Populated places in Shawano County, Wisconsin